Magneettimedia is a Finnish free and online newspaper. It was initially published by retail chain J. Kärkkäinen but currently it is published by Pohjoinen perinne, a society linked with the Finnish Resistance Movement.

Controversies 
In 2011 Skepsis ry, a society of Finnish sceptics, awarded J. Kärkkäinen a Huuhaa Prize, a prize for promoting pseudo-science, for publishing Magneettimedia. Skepsis accused Magneettimedia of promoting alternative medicine and conspiracy theories.

In October 2013 Magneettimedia'''s editor-in-chief Juha Kärkkäinen and the J. Kärkkäinen company were convicted of agitation against an ethnic group. This verdict was given due to anti-Semitic articles on Magneettimedia. For example, Magneettimedia has denied the Holocaust and accused Jews and Zionists of plotting to rule over the world. After the verdict Magneettimedia ceased being published in paper form but continued as an online newspaper. However, in April 2015 a new paper edition of Magneettimedia was published.

As of 2015, Magneettimedia did not identify its editor-in-chief, which is illegal under Finnish law.

 See also 

 MV-media''

References

External links
 Official website

Free newspapers
Newspapers published in Finland
Publications with year of establishment missing
Finnish-language newspapers
Neo-Nazism in Finland